The Journal of American Folklore is a peer-reviewed academic journal published by the American Folklore Society. The journal has been published since the society's founding in 1888. Since 2003, this has been published at the University of Illinois Press. It publishes on a quarterly schedule and incorporates scholarly articles, essays, and notes relating to its field. It also includes reviews of books, exhibitions and events.

Editors
The following people have been editor-in-chief of the journal:

References

External links 
 

Quarterly journals
Publications established in 1888
English-language journals
University of Illinois Press academic journals
Folklore journals
Academic journals associated with learned and professional societies